Poznań '56 is a Polish historical film about the Poznań 1956 protests. It was released in 1996.

References

External links
Poznań '56 at the Internet Movie Database

1996 films
Polish historical films
1990s Polish-language films
1990s historical films